Skate America is an international, senior-level figure skating competition held as part of the ISU Grand Prix of Figure Skating series. It is hosted by U.S. Figure Skating. The location changes yearly. Medals are awarded in four disciplines: men's singles, ladies' singles, pair skating, and ice dancing.

The first Skate America (officially called Norton Skate) was held in 1979 in Lake Placid, New York, and was the test event for the 1980 Winter Olympic Games. It was incorporated into the Grand Prix Series in 1995, the year of the series' inception.

On September 27, 2001, the Heinz Frozen Foods Company, an affiliate of the H. J. Heinz Company, agreed to become an official sponsor of the U.S. Figure Skating. This gave them the right to rename the competition to Smart Ones Skate America, using their brand name of frozen foods.

Venues

Medalists

Men

Ladies

Pairs

Ice dancing

References

External links

 
 
 
 
 
 
 
 
 
 
 
 
 
 
 
 
 
 

 
ISU Grand Prix of Figure Skating
International figure skating competitions hosted by the United States
Recurring sporting events established in 1979
1979 establishments in New York (state)